Neishi Dam  is a rockfill dam located in Iwate Prefecture in Japan. The dam is used for flood control. The catchment area of the dam is 15.7 km2. The dam impounds about 15  ha of land when full and can store 1425 thousand cubic meters of water. The construction of the dam was started on 1985 and completed in 2000.

See also
List of dams in Japan

References

Dams in Iwate Prefecture